Albert Edward Richardson was an iron turner and fitter from Ashton-under-Lyne, Lancashire, who designed the first practical Teasmade.

He designed the first practical Teasmade based on an alarm clock, a spirit lamp and a tipping kettle. He sold the design to gunsmith Frank Clarke of Birmingham, who patented it in 1902, calling it "An Apparatus Whereby a Cup of Tea or Coffee is Automatically Made".

References

Year of birth missing
Year of death missing
English inventors
People from Ashton-under-Lyne